Eurotrash is the second studio album of the Norwegian industrial rock band Zeromancer.

The album spawned two singles, "Doctor Online" and "Need You Like a Drug", and a cover of Real Life's "Send Me an Angel". Need You Like a Drug hit number one on the Deutsche Alternative Charts in 2002.

Track listing 
 "Doctor Online"
 "Eurotrash"
 "Need You Like a Drug"
 "Chrome Bitch"
 "Wannabe"
 "Neo Geisha"
 "Cupola"
 "Send Me an Angel" (Real Life cover)
 "Plasmatic"
 "Raising Hell"
 "Philharmonic"
 "Germany"
All songs by Ljung, except "Send Me an Angel" (by David Sterry and Richard Zatorski).

Personnel 
Alex Møklebust – vocals
Kim Ljung – bass, backing vocals
Noralf Ronthi – drums
Chris Schleyer – guitar
Erik Ljunggren – keyboard, programming

References 

AllMusic review

2001 albums
Zeromancer albums